Frenchman's Cove Resort, previously known as Frenchman's Cove Hotel, is a hotel located on a  property near Port Antonio on Jamaica's northeastern shore. It is considered to be the world's first all-inclusive hotel with a history indicating its role in Jamaica's tourism industry.

The hotel was popular with guests in the 1960s and considered to be one of the most expensive hotels at the time at $1000 per week. It is currently underused. Nevertheless, and although very small in size the Frenchman's Cove beach is one of the best in the island even when compared with the beautiful Seven Mile's beach in Negril. The small cliffs on both sides of the sea entrance along with the clear sands, the small blue lagoon and the dense vegetation that surrounds all the area makes of this beach a place with an atmosphere absolutely unique.

See also
 List of hotels in Jamaica
 List of beaches in Jamaica

References

External links
Aerial view
Frenchman's Cove
Frenchman's Cove Photo Gallery

Hotels in Jamaica
Resorts in Jamaica
Buildings and structures in Portland Parish